Santos Vega is a 1936 Argentine historical film directed by Luis Moglia Barth. It is based on the story of Santos Vega.

Cast
 Mario Baroffio 
 Cayetano Biondo 
 Enrique Chaico 
 Max Citelli 
 Miguel Coiro 
 Pablo Cumo 
 Floren Delbene
 Dora Ferreiro 
 Carlos Fioriti 
 José Franco 
 Nedda Francy 
 Ana Gryn 
 Pascual Nacarati 
 Fernando Ochoa
 Nathán Pinzón 
 Alfonso Pisano 
 Domingo Sapelli 
 Juan Sarcione 
 Marino Seré 
 Jorge Villoldo 
 Luis Zaballa 
 Enrique Zingoni

References

Bibliography 
 Emilio Pedro Portorrico. Diccionario biográfico de la música argentina de raíz folklórica. 2004.

External links 
 

1936 films
Argentine historical films
1930s historical films
1930s Spanish-language films
Films directed by Luis Moglia Barth
Films scored by Alejandro Gutiérrez del Barrio
Argentine black-and-white films
1930s Argentine films